This is a list of islands of Peru.

Alphabetical list
Amantaní (9.3 km²)
Anapia Island (3.4 km²)
Asia Island (1.5 km²)
Blanca Island (4.0 km²)
Caana Island (1.2 km²)
Chirita Islands (4,8 km²)
Correa Island (4.6 km²)
Frontón Island (1.0 km²)
Ferrol Island (1.6 km²)
Guañape Islands (1.4 km²)
Iscaya Island (1.7 km²)
La Vieja Island (11.0 km²)
Lobos de Tierra Island (16.0 km²)
Lobos de Afuera Island (2.0 km²)
Matapalo Island (6.1 km²)
Quipata Island (1.4 km²)
San Gallan Island (9.3 km²)
San Lorenzo Island (16.5 km²)
Santa Ana Islands (3.4 km²)
Soto Island (2.6 km²)
Taquile Island (5.7 km²)
Tortuga Island (1.3 km²)
Ustute Island (1.4 km²)
Yuspique Island (3.2 km²)
Viuda Island (1.3 km²)

Regional list
This a regional list of islands in Peru.

Ancash
Blanca Island (0.2 km²)

Arequipa
Carrizal Island (0.08 km²)
Casca Island (0.2 km²)
Los Frailes Island (0.08 km²)
Hollaques / Huallaques Island (0.1 km²)
Hornillos Island (0.3 km²)
"K" Island (0.3 km²)
"L" Island (0.02 km²)
"M" Island (0.02 km²)
Perica Island (0.01 km²)
Saragosa Island (0.3 km²)

Callao
Palomino Islands

Moquegua
Coles Island (0.1 km²)

Piura
Foca Island (0.9 km²)
"G" Island (0.4 km²)

See also
Geography of Peru
List of Peru-related topics
List of islands
List of islands by area
List of islands by highest point
List of islands by population
List of islands in lakes
List of islands in the Pacific Ocean
List of islands of South America

References

Islands
Peru